Witcherville is an unincorporated community in Sebastian County, in the U.S. state of Arkansas.  An old variant name was "Salem".

History
Witcherville was originally called "Salem", and under the latter name was platted in 1868 by William J. Witcher. A post office called Witcherville was established in 1875, and remained in operation until 1926.

References

Unincorporated communities in Sebastian County, Arkansas